Pigeon Island is one of the Grenadines uninhabited islands of Lesser Antilles in the Caribbean, part of the nation of Saint Vincent and the Grenadines.
It is about 400 meters southwest of the larger Isle à Quatre. In 1987, it received the status of the Pigeon Island Wildlife Reserve.

References

Uninhabited islands of Saint Vincent and the Grenadines